Aaron Smolinski is a Canadian actor. His first acting role was as at the age of two in the 1978 film Superman as the infant Clark Kent. He has also appeared in Superman II and in different roles in Superman III and Man of Steel.

He performed in multiple movies, Superman, Superman II, and Superman III, as well as many TV commercials. At primary school, Aaron was very athletic, participating in soccer, ice hockey and gymnastics. When his family moved to southern California, he gave up acting to follow gymnastics. His family moved back to Calgary where he enrolled at the University of Calgary to study for a career in child psychology.

Aaron Smolinski has two children: Addyson and Logan Smolinski. His brother, Travis, has three children: Hunter, Colton, and Sierra Smolinski.

Filmography

Film

TV

References

External links

Biography

1975 births
Living people
Canadian male film actors
Canadian male television actors